Schwarcz is a surname. Notable people with the surname include:

Joseph A. Schwarcz, Canadian chemist and writer
June Schwarcz (1918–2015), American artist
Mordechai Schwarcz (1914–1938), Czech-born Jewish police officer in Mandatory Palestine
Steven L. Schwarcz, American lawyer
Vera Schwarcz (born 1947), American sinologist

See also
Schwartz (disambiguation)